The OSTIM Industrial Zone (Ortadoğu Sanayi ve Ticaret Merkezi, OSTİM) is a large industrial park in Ankara, Turkey aimed at Small and medium enterprises (SMEs). With around 5000 companies in eight main sectors and 50,000 employees over an area of 5 million square metres, it is Turkey's largest industrial production area. It was established in the mid-1970s.

Its investment and marketing company, Ostim Endustriyel Yatirimlar ve Isletme AS, founded in 1998, is quoted on the Istanbul Stock Exchange (as OSTIM).

See also
Economy of Ankara

References

Industrial parks in Turkey
Economy of Ankara